Scott Roberts is a Canadian voice, film and stage actor.

Voice roles

Animated series
The Little Prince (2010 TV series) - Ivory (the son of Anemone, in love with Euphony) in "The Planet of Music" arc

Anime
Cardfight!! Vanguard – Shin
D.I.C.E. –  Tak Carter
Di Gi Charat Nyo! – Yasushi Omocha
Doki Doki School Hours – Yuichi Kudo
Dragon Ball – Aftermath Spectator 6, Announcements, Blue Subordinate 2, Cop Glasses, Man with Megaphone, Monk 2,  Pamput, Soldier 3, Spectator 2 (Blue Water dub)
Dragon Ball GT – Boy in Arcade 1, Cop, Gohan, Negotiator, Oob (Blue Water dub)
Fancy Lala – Hoshizawa, TV Show Host
Flame of Recca – Recca Hanabishi
Jubei-chan: The Ninja Girl – Shiro Ryujoji
Mobile Fighter G Gundam – George de Sand
Mobile Suit Zeta Gundam – Kai Shiden
My-HiME – Masashi Takeda
Pretty Cure – Kirea
Scan2Go – Zero
The Law of Ueki – Inumaru
Tide-Line Blue – Orange-Haired Ulysses Tech, Ostrich Handler 1,  Ulysses Sonar Officer
Viper's Creed – Haruki
Zoids: Chaotic Century and Zoids: Guardian Force – Hiltz

Video games
Dynasty Warriors: Gundam – Apolly Bay
Dynasty Warriors: Gundam 2 – Apolly Bay
Mobile Suit Gundam: Gundam vs. Zeta Gundam – Apolly Bay
Battle Assault 3 featuring Gundam Seed – Athrun Zala
Dynasty Warriors: Gundam 3 – Kou Uraki
Mobile Suit Gundam SEED: Never Ending Tomorrow – Lowe Gule
InuYasha: The Secret of the Cursed Mask – Mokichi 
Mega Man Powered Up – Oil Man

Film acting
(Malvolio 2009 Film) – Malvolio
(Shutout 2011 Film)  – Jim

References

External links 
 
 

Living people
Canadian male film actors
Canadian male stage actors
Canadian male video game actors
Canadian male voice actors
Year of birth missing (living people)